Danielle Renee Reed is an American geneticist employed at the Monell Chemical Senses Center in Philadelphia, Pennsylvania. She is most notable for her papers regarding genetic variation in taste and obesity in mice and humans.

Early life and education
Reed has a Ph.D. in psychology from Yale University, which she attended from 1984 to 1990.

Danielle Reed began her training as a scientist in the laboratory of Stephen Woods at the University of Washington, studying the role of hormonal signals on food intake in rodents. She did her doctoral dissertation with Judith Rodin at Yale University and Mark Friedman (scientist) at the Monell Chemical Senses Center, focusing on how rodent metabolism changes in response to short term exposure to high-fat diets. As a postdoctoral fellow in the laboratory of Arlen Price at the University of Pennsylvania, she learned human genetics, focusing on mapping of genes for human obesity and taste using family-based linkage methods.

Career
She is most notable for her papers regarding genetic variation in taste and obesity in mice and humans. Reed's seminal studies on the genetics of bitter taste perception led to identification of a critical region of human Chromosome 5p15 whose variation correlated with a person's ability to taste the bitterness of PROP (propylthiouracil). This finding ultimately led to the discovery by Adler and co-workers (Charles Zuker) of a family of bitter taste receptors (taste receptor) located within this critical region of the chromosome.  In 2008, Reed received the IFF Award For Outstanding Research On The Molecular Basis Of Taste in recognition of her contributions to the field, and delivered the IFF Lecture at the 2008 ACHemS meeting.

She established her own laboratory in 2001 at the Monell Chemical Senses Center and her research is divided between genetic mapping of obesity loci in rodent models and human genetics of taste and smell.

Reed has conducted numerous studies of identical twins in order to help tease our the genetic basis for taste and smell preferences.

She teaches a summer class called "A Taste of Chemistry," which is sponsored in part by The Camille and Henry Dreyfus Foundation. She collaborates with Mee-Ra Rhyu from the Korean Food Research Institute on the biology of human salt perception.

Awards
International Flavor and Fragrance Award for excellence in research, 2008

Select publications

References

External links
Reed's homepage on Monell's website
"A Taste of Chemistry" program for high school science teachers 
Why I do science: Danielle Reed
Genetics of Grocery Shopping

Year of birth missing (living people)
Living people
Yale University alumni
American geneticists